Robert Maynard (19 September 1684 – 4 January 1751) was a British lieutenant, and later captain, in the Royal Navy. Little is known about Maynard's early life, other than he was born in England in 1684 and then later joined the English Navy.

In November 1718, Maynard was tasked with hunting down and killing the notorious pirate Blackbeard. While leading , Maynard lured Blackbeard into attacking his ship off the coast of North Carolina, and in the ensuing struggle Maynard and his crew killed Blackbeard. Expecting to be rewarded for his actions, Maynard was never fully compensated or paid for the expedition. He was eventually promoted to commander in 1739, and to captain in 1740, before dying at the age of 66 in his home county of Kent, England.

Early life
Maynard was born in Dartford, Kent, England on 19 September 1684.

Naval commands and battles
Governor Alexander Spotswood of the Colony of Virginia gave Maynard the command of two sloops, Ranger and Jane. They departed the docks of Hampton, Virginia on 19 November 1718. Maynard caught up with Blackbeard at Ocracoke Inlet off the coast of North Carolina on 22 November 1718. Most of Blackbeard's men were ashore, whilst Maynard out-gunned and out-numbered the pirates three to one. However, Maynard's ship had no cannons and only small-arms, while Blackbeard's had up to eight cannons, though Maynard hid most of his men below deck. Initially, Blackbeard had his ship go to shallower water. Maynard's heavier ship hit a sand-bar and was stuck. Blackbeard then manoeuvred his ship to fire a broadside at Maynard's ship. Meanwhile, Maynard, who was on the sloop Jane, ordered everything inessential to combat to be thrown overboard to make the ship lighter, and eventually freed the ship. Blackbeard's ship fired at least two more broadsides on Maynard's, killing several of Maynard's men. After the last attack, it appeared to the attackers that only Maynard and another crew member were left alive and Blackbeard and some of his men boarded Maynard's ship. He was then ambushed by a force much larger than he had expected; Maynard had told his surviving soldiers to hide below deck only to come out and attack at a given signal. During the battle, Maynard and Blackbeard ended up in hand-to-hand combat. Both pointed pistols at each other. Maynard shot his adversary at point-blank range, while Blackbeard missed. However the shot failed to stop his opponent and barely slowed him down. Both drew their cutlasses and a melee ensued between the two. After a short period, Blackbeard manages to break Maynard's cutlass. When Blackbeard was about to deliver a killing blow to Maynard, another sailor, a highlander, jumped on Blackbeard's back and inflicted a deep wound. With the intervention of another sailor, this redirected Blackbeard’s cutlass and struck Maynard’s knuckles instead of killing him. Maynard and his crew were then able to kill Blackbeard.

Maynard later examined Teach's body, noting that it had been shot no fewer than five times and cut about twenty. He also found several items of correspondence, including a letter to Teach from Tobias Knight, the Royal Secretary for North Carolina. Blackbeard was decapitated and his head was tied to the bowsprit of his ship for the trip back to Virginia. Upon returning to his home port of Hampton, the head was placed on a stake near the mouth of the Hampton River as a warning to other pirates.

Lieutenant Maynard remained at Ocracoke for several more days, making repairs and burying the dead. Teach's loot – sugar, cocoa, indigo and cotton – found "in pirate sloops and ashore in a tent where the sloops lay", was sold at auction along with sugar and cotton found in Tobias Knight's barn, for £2,238.  Governor Spotswood used a portion of this to pay for the entire operation. The prize money for capturing Teach was to have been about £400, but it was split between the crews of HMS Lyme and HMS Pearl. As Captain Brand and his troops had not been the ones fighting for their lives, Maynard thought this extremely unfair. It was later discovered that he and his crew had helped themselves to about £90 of Teach's booty. The two companies did not receive their prize money for another four years, and despite his bravery, Maynard was not promoted, rather, he faded into obscurity.

Legacy
Maynard's final resting place is in the churchyard of St Martin's Church at Great Mongeham in Kent, southeast England, near the cinque port of Deal. He left an estate in excess of £2,000.

Maynard's success is still celebrated by his successor – the crew of the current HMS Ranger – who commemorate Blackbeard's defeat at the annual Sussex University Royal Naval Unit Blackbeard Night mess dinner every year, at a date as close as possible to 22 November.

The city of Hampton, Virginia also celebrates its historic ties to Maynard by recreating the final sea battle on Tall Ships in the Hampton Harbour during the city's annual Blackbeard Festival in June.

References

External links
When Blackbeard Scourged the Seas
Scientists Show Relics From Ship Fit For Pirate, Possibly Blackbeard, Chicago Tribune
Blackbeard's Final Prize – The "Martinique Sugar" Ship

1684 births
1751 deaths
18th-century Royal Navy personnel
Royal Navy officers
People involved in anti-piracy efforts